The Canadian Screen Award for Best Editing in a Documentary is an annual award, presented as part of the Canadian Screen Awards program to honour the year's best editing in a documentary film. It is presented separately from the Canadian Screen Award for Best Editing for narrative feature films.

An award for Best Editing in a Non-Feature, with its nominees consisting entirely of short or television documentary films, was presented at the 1st Genie Awards in 1980s and an award for Best Editing in a Documentary was presented at the shortlived Bijou Awards in 1981, although the Academy never presented an award for editing in theatrical feature documentaries until the 3rd Canadian Screen Awards in 2015. The non-feature winners from 1980 and 1981 have, however, been included below.

1980s

2010s

2020s

See also
Prix Iris for Best Editing in a Documentary

References

Film editing awards
Editing in a Documentary
Canadian documentary film awards